Look Down, See Us is the second EP by Trickfinger, the alias of musician John Frusciante, released March 29, 2020 at the launch of the Evar Records label.  The four songs were recorded more recently than the first two full-length Trickfinger albums.

Background
Like its predecessors, the Red Hot Chili Peppers guitarist recorded the music for Look Down, See Us on his own. On his fourth release as Trickfinger, John Frusciante celebrates the launch of a new record company alongside Marcia Pinna.  Look Down, See Us is only available as a digital download.

Track listing

References

2020 EPs
John Frusciante EPs